David Njoku (born July 10, 1996) is an American football tight end for the Cleveland Browns of the National Football League (NFL). He played college football at Miami (FL). He was drafted by the Browns in the first round of the 2017 NFL Draft.

Early years
Njoku is one of nine children born to Nigerian parents who immigrated to the United States. He attended Cedar Grove High School in Cedar Grove, New Jersey. During his career, he had 76 receptions for 1,794 yards and 19 touchdowns. A 3-star tight end recruit, Njoku committed to Miami (FL) to play college football over offers from Boston College, Ohio State, and Temple.  Njoku also competed in the high jump in high school, winning the national championship at the New Balance Nationals Outdoor his senior year in 2014.

College career
After redshirting his first year at Miami in 2014, Njoku played in all 13 games with four starts in 2015 and had 21 receptions for 362 yards and one touchdown. In 2016, he had 43 receptions for 698 yards and eight touchdowns. After the season, Njoku decided to forgo his remaining two years of eligibility and enter the 2017 NFL Draft.

College statistics

Source:

Professional career

Njoku received an invitation to the NFL Combine and completed all of the combine and positional drills. In addition, he attended Miami's Pro Day and opted to again perform the vertical jump, broad jump, short shuttle, 40-yard dash, 20-yard dash, and 10-yard dash. NFL draft experts and analysts projected Njoku to be selected in the first round of the draft. He was ranked the third best tight end available in the draft by Sports Illustrated and was ranked the second best tight end by ESPN, NFL analyst Mike Mayock, and NFL analyst Bucky Brooks.

The Cleveland Browns selected Njoku in the first round (29th overall) of the 2017 NFL Draft. He was the third tight end to be selected in the draft.

2017 season
On June 15, 2017, the Cleveland Browns signed Njoku to a fully guaranteed, four-year, $9.52 million contract which included a signing bonus of $5.06 million.

On September 10, Njoku made his NFL debut in a 21–18 loss to the Pittsburgh Steelers. He had two receptions for 20 yards. in the Week 2 game against the Baltimore Ravens, he had three receptions for 27 yards and his first NFL touchdown in the 24–10 loss. He finished his rookie year with 32 catches for 386 yards and four touchdowns.

2018 season
In 2018, Njoku entered the season as the Browns starting tight end. He played in all 16 games with 14 starts, recording 56 catches for 639 yards and four touchdowns.

2019 season
In Week 2 of the 2019 season, Njoku was upended and landed on his head and left the game against the New York Jets due to a concussion. However, later in the week, it was revealed that Njoku suffered a broken wrist on the same play. He was placed on injured reserve on September 20, 2019. He was designated for return from injured reserve on November 20, 2019, and began practicing with the team again. He was activated on December 7, 2019.

2020 season
On April 27, 2020, the Browns exercised the fifth-year option on Njoku's contract. Njoku was placed on injured reserve on September 14, 2020, with a knee injury, a day after he posted 3 catches for 50 yards and a touchdown against the Baltimore Ravens. He was activated on October 10.

2021 season
In Week 5 against the Los Angeles Chargers, Njoku caught 7 passes for 149 yards and a touchdown, with the score coming off a 71 yard catch and run. The Browns would go on to lose 47-42 in a thriller.

2022 season
The Browns placed the franchise tag on Njoku on March 7, 2022. On May 27, 2022, Njoku signed a four-year, $56.75 million contract extension.

NFL career statistics

Regular season

References

1996 births
Living people
African-American players of American football
American football tight ends
American sportspeople of Nigerian descent
Cleveland Browns players
Miami Hurricanes football players
People from Cedar Grove, New Jersey
Players of American football from New Jersey
Sportspeople from Essex County, New Jersey
21st-century African-American sportspeople